Girl Crazy is a 1930 musical by George Gershwin with lyrics by Ira Gershwin and book by Guy Bolton and John McGowan. Ethel Merman made her stage debut in the first production and co-lead Ginger Rogers became an overnight star. Rich in song, it follows the story of Danny Churchill who has been sent to fictional Custerville, Arizona, to manage his family's ranch. His father wants him there to focus on matters more serious than alcohol and women but Danny turns the place into a dude ranch, importing showgirls from Broadway and hiring Kate Forthergill (Merman's role) as entertainer. Visitors come from both Coasts and Danny falls in love with the local postmistress, Molly Gray (Rogers' role). 

Three subsequent film adaptations adjusted the plot. The most notable, in 1943, starred Mickey Rooney and Judy Garland, with the latter playing a combined Kate and Molly.

Productions
The musical opened at the Alvin Theatre on October 14, 1930 and closed on June 6, 1931 after 272 performances. It was directed by Alexander Leftwich, with choreography by George Hale and sets by Donald Oenslager. This musical made a star of Ginger Rogers, who, with Allen Kearns, sang "Could You Use Me?" and "Embraceable You" and, with Willie Howard, "But Not for Me". Ethel Merman, in her Broadway debut sang "I Got Rhythm", "Sam and Delilah", and "Boy! What Love Has Done To Me!" and "became an overnight sensation...that launched her fifty year career."  Also of note is the opening night pit orchestra,  which was composed of many well-known jazz musicians, including Benny Goodman, Gene Krupa, Glenn Miller and Jimmy Dorsey.

"The score was one of the Gershwins' best" according to theatre writer Ken Bloom.

A version with a heavily revised book was presented in 1975 by the St. Louis Municipal Opera Theatre and in 1979 by the Coachlight Dinner Theater (East Windsor, CT).

In 1992 the show appeared on Broadway in a heavily revised version. It was given a new title, Crazy for You, and a completely new plot, and interpolated with material from other Gershwin stage shows and films, specifically songs written for the Fred Astaire movies of the 1930s such as "Nice Work If You Can Get It" from A Damsel in Distress and "They Can't Take That Away From Me" from Shall We Dance.

"Musicals Tonight!", New York City, presented a staged concert in September 2001.

An abridged version of Girl Crazy was presented at the Kennedy Center in Washington, DC October 2–5, 2008 as part of their Broadway: Three Generations production. Max von Essen played Danny, Jenn Colella played Molly, and Randy Graff played Kate, directed by Lonny Price.

The New York City Center Encores! staged concert was held in November 2009. Directed by Jerry Zaks, it starred Ana Gasteyer, Marc Kudisch, Becki Newton, and Wayne Knight.

The two-time Olympic champion and Emmy-winning television commentator Dick Button starred as Danny in a 1958 production, which also co-starred Jane Connell as Kate and Gordon Connell as Pete; it interpolated Gershwin's "They All Laughed" and "Nice Work If You can Get It" into the score.

Songs (per 1954 published score from Harms, Inc. – New World Music Corp.)

Act I
 Overture
 1. Opening Number, Scene I: "The Lonesome Cowboy Won't Be Lonesome Now!" — The Foursome & Cowboys
 2. Incidental (Entrance of Molly)
 3. "Bidin' My Time" — The Foursome
 4. "Could You Use Me" (with dance) — Danny & Molly
 5. "Bidin' My Time" (reprise) — The Foursome
 6. Opening Number, Scene II: "Bronco Busters" (with dance & lariat specialty) — Bronco Busters; Dudeens & Cowboys
 7. Change of Scene ("Bronco Busters")
 8. "Barbary Coast" (with specialty dance and encore) — Patsy, Tess & Ensemble; Specialty Dance by Flora & Girls
 9. "Embraceable You" (with dance and encore) — Danny & Molly
 10. Finaletto: "Goldfarb, That's I'm!" — Gieber, Slick & Chorus
 11. "Bidin' My Time" (reprise) — The Foursome
 12. Incidental: Change of Scene ("Goldfarb")
 13. "Embraceable You" (Reprise) — Danny & Molly
 14. "Sam and Delilah" — Frisco Kate & Ensemble
 15. "I Got Rhythm" (with dance, quartet vocal, eccentric dance and encore) — Kate, The Foursome & Specialty Dancers
 16. Finale I: "Bronco Busters" (reprise), "Embraceable You" (reprise), Melodrama, and "Sam and Delilah" (reprise)  — Danny, Kate & Ensemble
	 
Act II
 17. Entr'Acte (Cornet Specialty) — A Singer
 18A. Opening Number, Scene I: "Land of the Gay Caballero" — Chorus & Specialty Dancers
 18B. Solo Dance Specialty ("Gay Caballero") — Flora
 19. "But Not For Me" — Molly & Gieber
 20. "Treat Me Rough" (with dance) — Slick & Girls; Dance by Flora, Girls and Cowboys
 21. "Boy! What Love Has Done to Me!" (with dance finish and encore) — Kate
 22. Incidental: Torch Song ("Boy! What Love Has Done to Me!")
 23. For Change of Scene II ("Boy! What Love Has Done to Me!")
 24A. Following Blackout ("Lonesome Cowboy")
 24B. "When It's Cactus Time in Arizona" (with Ukulele & Guitar specialty dance; then girls rope number to "Treat Me Rough") — Molly & Boys
 25. Finale II: "Embraceable You" (reprise) and "I Got Rhythm" (reprise) — Entire Company

Original cast
Willie Howard as Gieber Goldfarb
Allen Kearns as Danny Churchill
Ginger Rogers as Molly Gray
William Kent as Slick Fothergill
Ethel Merman as Frisco Kate Fothergill
Eunice Healy as Flora James
Olive Brady as Tess Parker
Peggy O'Connor as Patsy West
Clyde Veaux as Pete
Carlton Macy as Lank Sanders
Ray Johnson, Del Porter, Marshall Smith and Dwight Snyder as The Foursome

The pit orchestra included "Red" Nichols, Glenn Miller, Gene Krupa, Tommy Dorsey, Benny Goodman and Jack Teagarden.<ref>The 1953 biopic “The Glenn Miller Story”, starring Jimmy Stewart, recreated the “I’m Biding My Time” sequence, with Miller (Stewart) playing tombone in the pit orchestra. Girl Crazy notes" New York City Center" accessed January 16, 2011</ref>  Roger Edens was the onstage pianist for Ethel Merman. It was conducted on opening night by George Gershwin himself. The 1953 biopic “The Glenn Miller Story” recreated the “I’m Biding My Time” scene, with Miller (Stewart) playing trombone in the orchestra.

Reception
It was said by one critic to be "fresh, ingenious...a rich delight".

Film adaptations

The 1932 RKO Radio Pictures production was very unlike the stage play except for its score. The film was tailored for the comic talents of Wheeler & Woolsey, a then-popular comedy team. In 1943, Metro-Goldwyn-Mayer produced a lavish version starring Mickey Rooney and Judy Garland. In 1965, MGM once again made the musical into a film, for Connie Francis. Unlike the previous two versions, the title was changed to When the Boys Meet the Girls''. It co-starred Herman's Hermits, Sam the Sham and the Pharaohs, Louis Armstrong, and Liberace. A number of Gershwin songs were retained, including "Embraceable You", "Bidin' My Time", "But Not for Me", "Treat Me Rough", and "I Got Rhythm".

Recordings
No original cast recording was ever made, as original cast recordings did not exist in the U.S. prior to 1943. Several studio recordings of the score have been released, including an early 1950s version with Mary Martin, but the only one using the full score and original 1930 orchestrations was released by Nonesuch Records (Nonesuch 9 79250-2) in 1990 with Lorna Luft (Kate), Frank Gorshin (Gieber Goldfarb),  David Carroll (Danny), and Judy Blazer (Molly).

References

External links 
 
The New York Times book of Broadway'', Macmillan, 2001, pp. 78–79, 
Girl Crazy on Ovrtur.com
"Girl Crazy" synopsis on Masterworks Broadway

Musicals by George Gershwin
1930 musicals
Broadway musicals